"No Time to Kill" is a song co-written and recorded by American country music singer Clint Black.  It was released in August 1993 as the second single and the title track from his album No Time to Kill.  The song peaked at number 3 on the U.S. Billboard Hot Country Singles & Tracks chart and at number 2 on the Canadian RPM Country Tracks chart.  It was written by Black and Hayden Nicholas.

Chart positions
"No Time to Kill" debuted at number 57 on the U.S. Billboard Hot Country Singles & Tracks for the week of August 14, 1993.

Year-end charts

References

1993 singles
1993 songs
Clint Black songs
Songs written by Clint Black
Songs written by Hayden Nicholas
Song recordings produced by James Stroud
RCA Records singles